International Day of Remembrance of the Victims of Slavery and the Transatlantic Slave Trade is a United Nations international observance designated in 2007 to be marked on 25 March every year. 

The day honours and remembers those who suffered and died as a consequence of the transatlantic slave trade, which has been called "the worst violation of human rights in history", in which over 400 years more than 15 million men, women and children were the victims.

History 
It was first observed in 2008 with the theme "Breaking the Silence, Lest We Forget". The theme of 2015 was "Women and Slavery". The International Day also "aims at raising awareness about the dangers of racism and prejudice today". 

With 2015 marking the start of the UN's International Decade for People of African Descent, a permanent memorial was unveiled at the UN headquarters in New York, entitled "The Ark of Return" and designed by Haitian-American architect Rodney Leon, who also designed the African Burial Ground National Monument.

See also 
History of slavery
International Day for the Remembrance of the Slave Trade and its Abolition
United Nations Slavery Memorial

References

External links 

 
 International Day of Remembrance of the Victims of Slavery and the Transatlantic Slave Trade on the United Nations Population Fund website

United Nations days
March observances
Remembrance days
Slavery in Africa